Oktyabrsky is a rural locality (a settlement) and the administrative center of Prigorodny Selsoviet, Kamensky District, Altai Krai, Russia. The population was 443 as of 2013. There are 10 streets.

Geography 
Oktyabrsky is located 20 km southwest of Kamen-na-Obi (the district's administrative centre) by road. Novodubrovsky is the nearest rural locality.

References 

Rural localities in Kamensky District, Altai Krai